In Greek mythology, Crataeis (Κραταιίς, -ίδος, alt. Crataiis) is, by some accounts, the mother of Scylla. In Homer's Odyssey, Circe tells Odysseus:

"Nay, row past with all thy might, and call upon Crataiis, the mother of Scylla, who bore her for a bane to mortals. Then will she keep her from darting forth again." (Translation by A. T. Murray)

Several authors follow Homer in assigning Crataeis as the mother of Scylla, see  Ovid, Metamorphoses 13.749; Apollodorus, E7.20;  Servius on Virgil Aeneid 3.420; and schol. on Plato, Republic 588c. Neither Homer nor Ovid mention a father for Scylla, but Apollodorus says that the father was either Trienus (Triton?) or Phorcus (a variant of Phorkys), similarly the Plato scholiast, perhaps following Apollodorus, gives the father as Tyrrhenus or Phorcus, while Eustathius on Homer, Odyssey 12.85 gives the father as Triton.

Other authors have Hecate as Scylla's mother. The Hesiodic Megalai Ehoiai gives Hecate and Phorbas as the parents of Scylla, while Acusilaus says that Scylla's parents were Hecate and Phorkys (so also schol. Odyssey 12.85). Perhaps trying to reconcile these conflicting accounts, Apollonius of Rhodes says that Crataeis was another name for Hecate, and that she and Phorcys were the parents of Scylla. Likewise, Semos of Delos (FGrHist 396 F 22) says that Crataeis was the daughter of Hecate and Triton, and mother of Scylla by Deimos. Stesichorus (alone) names Lamia as the mother of Scylla, possibly the  Lamia who was the daughter of Poseidon, while according to Hyginus, Scylla was the offspring of Typhon and Echidna.

Notes

References
 Apollodorus, Apollodorus, The Library, with an English Translation by Sir James George Frazer, F.B.A., F.R.S. in 2 Volumes. Cambridge, MA, Harvard University Press; London, William Heinemann Ltd. 1921.  Online version at the Perseus Digital Library.
 Apollonius of Rhodes, Apollonius Rhodius: the Argonautica, translated by Robert Cooper Seaton, W. Heinemann, 1912. Internet Archive
 Campbell, David A., Greek Lyric III: Stesichorus, Ibycus, Simonides, and Others, Harvard University Press, 1991. .
 Fowler, R. L., Early Greek Mythography: Volume 2: Commentary, Oxford University Press, 2013. .
 Gantz, Timothy, Early Greek Myth: A Guide to Literary and Artistic Sources, Johns Hopkins University Press, 1996, Two volumes:  (Vol. 1),  (Vol. 2).
 Homer; The Odyssey with an English Translation by A.T. Murray, PH.D. in two volumes. Cambridge, MA., Harvard University Press; London, William Heinemann, Ltd. 1919. Online version at the Perseus Digital Library.
 Hyginus, Gaius Julius, The Myths of Hyginus. Edited and translated by Mary A. Grant, Lawrence: University of Kansas Press, 1960.
 Most, G.W., Hesiod: The Shield, Catalogue of Women, Other Fragments, Loeb Classical Library, No. 503, Cambridge, Massachusetts, Harvard University Press, 2007, 2018. . Online version at Harvard University Press.
 Ogden, Daniel, Drakon: Dragon Myth and Serpent Cult in the Greek and Roman Worlds, Oxford University Press, 2013. .
 Ovid, Metamorphoses, Brookes More. Boston. Cornhill Publishing Co. 1922. Online version at the Perseus Digital Library.

Naiads